Western State Hospital is a psychiatric hospital located at 9601 Steilacoom Boulevard SW in Lakewood, Washington. Administered by the Washington Department of Social and Health Services (DSHS), it is a large facility with 806 beds, and Washington's second-oldest state-owned enterprise (after the University of Washington).
 
One of two state-owned adult psychiatric hospitals, the other being Eastern State Hospital in Medical Lake, the hospital currently treats patients using psychiatric medications, mental health counseling, group therapy, drug, psychiatric rehabilitation, and behavior modification therapies. The hospital is divided into 4 specific acute treatment areas: PTRC Central and South for the treatment of civil and voluntarily committed adult patients, PTRC East for the treatment of older and geriatric patients, both civil and voluntary, the Center for Forensic Services that provides court-ordered evaluations and treatment for patients with legal charges or convictions, and the Child Study and Treatment Center, which provides treatment for children under the age of 18 years.

History
The facility was established in Washington Territory as Fort Steilacoom Asylum in 1871, predating statehood by almost 20 years, in former buildings of Fort Steilacoom, which was a U.S. Army post from 1849 to 1868. In 1875, the territorial government took control due to complaints about patient neglect, brutal abuse and poor living conditions.
 
The original buildings of the asylum were demolished in 1886 to make way for a larger structure. It was renamed Western Washington Hospital for the Insane and the main ward was completed in 1887. In each of the following decades numerous out-buildings were constructed. In 1915, it was renamed Western State Hospital and grew in various stages. One of its better known patients was Frances Farmer.

Recent controversies
Following news reports concerning serious understaffing at the hospital and several involuntarily committed patients escaping, including a person accused of murder, on Tuesday, April 12, 2016, governor Jay Inslee fired Western State Hospital's Chief Executive Officer, Ron Adler.

The escape follows years of other problems including workplace discrimination, sexual harassment lawsuits, and excessively long patient admission times.

Notable patients
Frances Farmer, actress

References

External links

Official Website at DSHS
Western State Hospital Memorial Cemetery at Find A Grave

Psychiatric hospitals in Washington (state)
Hospitals established in 1871
Hospital buildings completed in 1887
Buildings and structures in Pierce County, Washington
History of Pierce County, Washington
Lakewood, Washington
1871 establishments in Washington Territory